Didihat is a town and a Nagar Palika in Pithoragarh District in the state of Uttarakhand, India. It is one of the eleven administrative subdivisions of Pithoragarh district and also serves as its administrative headquarter.

Didihat is named after the Kumauni word 'Dand' meaning a small hillock. Didihat falls on the pilgrimage route to Kailash Mansarovar. Earlier it was known as “Digtad”. Present day name Didihat is derived from Hat Tharp village which is the heart of this town.

History

The area of present-day Didihat was ruled by Katyuri dynasty after the fall of katyuris. the region came under Malla kings of Sirakot. The ancient Shirakot Temple of Lord Malay Nath was built by the Raika Kings. Till the time of King Hari Malla, this region was under Doti  principality of the katyuri dynasty. Later on in 1581 AD at the time of Chand dynasty ruler Rudra Chand, this region came under the control of Chand rulers defeating Raikas of Doti. still today some remnants of ancient fort and temples are present in Didihat.

Didihat was a Tehsil in the Almora district of United Provinces in 1947 when India won its Independence from Britain. The Didihat Tehsil, along with other north-eastern parts of Almora district were transferred to the newly created Pithoragarh district in 1960. During 2001-2011 new tehsil Berinag was created by transferring 298 villages from Didihat tehsil. The creation of a new district, Didihat was declared on 15 August 2011, by then Chief Minister of Uttarakhand, Ramesh Pokhriyal, however, the district is yet to be officially formed.

Geography
The Nearest city with a population of one lakh and more is Haldwani while the Nearest city with a population of five lakh and more is Bareilly.

According to the Bureau of Indian Standards, the town falls under seismic zone 5, in a scale of 2 to 5 (in order of increasing vulnerability to earthquakes). Didihat has been struck by Flash Flood two times; on 20 July 2003 and 13 August 2007. 4 People lost their life in both these disasters. Flash floods are very common hydro-meteorological hazards due to excessive rainfall or snowmelt, bursting of dams, cloudburst, etc. Such floods are common due to the high velocity of water with much energetic capacity to carry away everything in its way.

Demographics

According to the 2011 Census of India, the population of Didihat Nagar Panchayat was 6,522. Didihat has a literacy rate of 91.03%; 95.20% of the men and 86.44% of the women are literate. Didihat's sex ratio in 2011 was 889 women per 1000 men. Almost all of the residents of Didihat are native Kumaonis. About 20.55% of the population belongs to the Scheduled Castes, numbering over 1,340 in the 2011 census. In addition, the city is home to some 649 people, who belong to the Scheduled Tribes. Didihat is the native place of 'Rajis', a Scheduled Tribe. Approximately 1,400 people live in slums within the city. Didihat had a population of 4805 according to the 2001 Census and 3514 according to the 1991 Census of India.

Economy
Didihat had traditionally been a place where merchants from adjoining areas brought their goods for sale on a prescribed day of the week. Wool and salt from tibet was exchanged for grain here. The "Kumaon Scheduled Tribes Development Corporation" established a "Carpet Center", a "Blanket Production Center" and a "Wool Production and Sales Center" at Didihat for the all-around economic-development of the Scheduled Tribes living here.

Culture

Didihat observes a wide range of festivals. Popular celebrations and observances include Kumauni Holi, which is celebrated in different forms such as the Baithki Holi, the Khari Holi and the Mahila Holi. The festival of lights, Deepavali, is celebrated with the lighting of lamps in every house, decorating the floors with rangoli, and sharing of sweets with relatives and Friends. Kumaoni is the mother tongue of majority in Didihat; however people speak Hindi as well. The dialect of Kumaoni spoken in Didihat is called 'Sirali'.

Village Hat Tharp is famous for its Hiran Chital Festival during rainy season. This village also conducts one of the oldest Ramlila’s of the Didihat area.

People of village Hat Tharp invented a unique idea about conserving their forest by dedicating the whole forest to Maa Bhagwati of Pankhu for 10 years. No one is allowed to take their axe and cut forest, only dry wood collection is allowed.

Tourism
Didihat is a Himalayan tourist destination situated 43 km from Pithoragarh. Didihat is situated on the hilltop plain of 'Digtarh' with the river Charamgad (Bhadigad) flowing below. Below the town there is a fertile 'Haat valley'. Within Didihat is the temple (mandir) known as Sirakot (Malaynath Mandir) of Lord Shiva (Bholenath).  Another mandir is situated in the top hill of the nanpaupu village is known as dechula.

Views of Himalayan snow-capped peaks can be observed from Didihat, especially Panchachuli and Trishul. Didihat is known for the ancient Shirakot Temple of Lord Malay Nath, built by Raika Kings. Approximately 8 km from here, is Narayan Swamy Ashram at Narayan Nagar. The regional Headquarters of ITBP is situated at Merthi at 6 km from Didihat. Askot Musk Deer Sanctuary is administratively situated in Didihat Tehsil.

There’s a large stone bigger than a house in the middle of a field in Village Hat Tharp known as Bheem Ka Patthar, every year people of village worship there. It is believed Bheem brought that stone and left there.

About 53 km from Didihat, the small hilly town Berinag is known for its natural environment. Berinag is also known for its nag mandirs. One small tea garden is also there. One of the most well-known gufa is known as "Patal Bhuvaneshwar", this is related to "Pandavas" Dvapara Yuga.

Administration
Didihat is a Class-V town and a nagar palika in Pithoragarh district  in the state of Uttarakhand, India. The Didihat city is divided into 4 wards for which elections are held every 5 years. Didihat Nagar Panchayat has a committee consisting of a chairman with ward members. Membership consists of a minimum of ten elected ward members and three nominated members. The Notified Area Committee members of the Nagar Panchayat are elected from the several wards of the Nagar Panchayat on the basis of adult franchise for a term of five years. Two Non-Notified Slums exist in Didihat; Nai Basti having 150 households and G.I.C. Ward with 180 households.

Administratively it is also a tehsil and a subdivision of the Pithoragarh district. Tehsil Didihat is divided into three developmental blocks—Didihat, Kanalichhina, and Berinag. Didihat tehsil is the second most populous tehsil in Pithoragarh and has the highest number of villages. There are about 367 villages in Didihat Tehsil.

Transport

Buses form the main form of Transport that connect the town to national capital Delhi and other cities. Buses are either run by state controlled Uttarakhand Transport Corporation or private K.M.O.U. Nearest Railway station is Tanakpur

Education
Didihat had a literacy rate of 79% in 2001 which rose to 91.03 percent in 2011. As of 2011, literacy rate among male and female were 95.20 and 86.44 percent respectively. Schools in Didihat are run either by the municipal corporation, or privately by entities, trusts and corporations. The majority of schools are affiliated with the Uttarakhand Board of School Education, although some are affiliated with the Central Board for Secondary Education, Council for the Indian School Certificate Examinations and National Institute of Open Schooling.

References

External links

Didihat official Instagram page
Hill stations in Uttarakhand
Cities and towns in Pithoragarh district